This is a list of mosques in Africa.

See also

 Islam in Africa
 Lists of mosques

References

!Africa

Mosques